The 2011 Big Ten Women’s Basketball Tournament was played between Thursday, March 3 and Sunday, March 6 at the Conseco Fieldhouse in Indianapolis, Indiana. The Big Ten Network carried every game except the final, which was aired on ESPN2. Ohio State won the tournament and received an automatic bid to the 2011 Women's NCAA tournament.

Seeds

All Big Ten schools participated in the tournament.  Teams were seeded by 2010–11 Big Ten Conference season record, with a tiebreaker system to seed teams with identical conference records (Tie-breaking Procedure.  The top 5 teams received a first round bye.

The seeding for the tournament was as follows:

Schedule

Bracket

All game times are ET.

References

Big Ten women's basketball tournament
Tournament
Big Ten women's basketball tournament
Big Ten women's basketball tournament
Basketball competitions in Indianapolis
College basketball tournaments in Indiana
Women's sports in Indiana